The following is a list of academic research centers devoted to Russian studies, or Slavic studies, encompassing the area of the former Soviet Union, sometimes referred to as Eurasia:

Arizona State University - The Melikian Center: Russian, Eurasian and East European Studies
Carleton University -  Institute of European, Russian, and Eurasian Studies
Columbia University - Harriman Institute for Russian, Eurasian and East European Studies
Dalian University of Foreign Languages - The Center for Russian Studies
Georgetown University - Center for Eurasian, Russian, and East European Studies
Harvard University - Davis Center for Russian and Eurasian studies (formerly Russian Research Center)
Hokkaido University - Slavic-Eurasian Research Center 
Indiana University - Inner Asian and Uralic National Resource Center
Indiana University Bloomington - Robert F. Byrnes Russian and East European Institute
Ohio State University - Center for Slavic and East European Studies
Stanford University - Center for Russian, East European and Eurasian Studies
University of California, Berkeley - Institute of Slavic, East European, and Eurasian Studies
University of California, Los Angeles - Center for European and Eurasian Studies
University of Chicago - Center for East European and Russian/Eurasian Studies
University of Illinois at Urbana–Champaign - Russian, East European, and Eurasian Center
University of Kansas - Center for Russian, East European and Eurasian Studies
University of Michigan - Center for Russian and East European Studies
University of Pittsburgh - Center for Russian, East European, and Eurasian Studies
University of Texas, Austin - Center for Russian, East European and Eurasian Studies
University of Virginia - Center for Russian, East European, and Eurasian Studies (CREEES)
University of Washington - Ellison Center for Russian, East European and Central Asian Studies
University of Wisconsin–Madison - Center for Russia, East Europe and Central Asia
University of North Carolina-Chapel Hill - Center for Slavic, Eurasian and East European Studies
George Washington University- Institute for European, Russian, and Eurasian Studies 
New Era University - Russian Studies Center

See also
 Bibliography of Russian history
 Bibliography of the Soviet Union (disambiguation)
 Kremlinology
 List of Slavic studies journals
 Russian culture
 Russian language
 Slavic studies

References

External links

Russian culture
Russian language
Russian studies